The keepers are heads of the various departments of the British Museum. They are professional curators and related academics. There are currently nine departments plus the Portable Antiquities Scheme that have keepers.

Keepers of Africa, Oceania and the Americas
The Keeper of Africa, Oceania and the Americas is head of the Department of Africa, Oceania and the Americas (Department of Ethnography until 2004).

 1953–1969: Adrian Digby
 1969–1974: William Buller Fagg
 1974–1990: Malcolm McLeod
 1991–2004: John Mack
 2005-2012: J. C. H. King
 2012–present: Lissant Bolton

Keepers of Ancient Egypt and Sudan
The Keeper of Ancient Egypt and Sudan is head of the Department of Ancient Egypt and Sudan (formerly Department of Egyptian and Assyrian Antiquities and then Department of Egyptian Antiquities).

 1893–1924: E. A. Wallis Budge
 1924–1930: Henry Hall
 1931–1948: Sidney Smith
 1948–1955: C. J. Gadd
 1955–1974: I. E. S. Edwards
 1974–1988: T. G. H. James
 1988–2011: Vivian Davies
 2012–2021: Neal Spencer

Keepers of Asia
The Keeper of Asia is head of the Department of Asia (until 2003, the Department of Oriental Antiquities).

 1946–1969: Basil Gray
 1969–1977 Douglas Barrett
 1977–1987 Lawrence Smith
 1987–1994: Jessica Rawson
 1994–2006: Robert Knox
 2006–2014: Jan Stuart
 2014–present: Jane Portal

Keepers of Japanese Antiquities
The Keeper of Japanese Antiquities was head of the Department of Japanese Antiquities. That department merged with the Department of Oriental Antiquities to form the Department of Asia.

 1987–1997: Lawrence R. H. Smith
 1997–2003: Victor Harris

Keepers of Britain, Europe and Prehistory
The Keeper of Britain, Europe and Prehistory is the head of the Department of Britain, Europe and Prehistory (previously known as the Department of Europe and Prehistory)

 2003–2007: Leslie Webster
 2012–2015: Roger Bland
 2015–present: Jill Cook

Keepers of British and Medieval Antiquities
The Keeper of British and Medieval Antiquities was the head of the Department of British and Medieval Antiquities (Department of British and Medieval Antiquities and Ethnography until 1921).

 1866–1896: Augustus Wollaston Franks 
 1896–1921: Sir Charles Hercules Read 
 1921–1928: Ormonde Maddock Dalton

Keepers of Prehistoric and Romano-British Antiquities
The Keeper of Prehistoric and Romano-British Antiquities was head of the Department of Prehistoric and Romano-British Antiquities. The department was created from the Department of British and Medieval Antiquities in 1969.

 1973–1995: Ian Heaps Longworth
 1995–2000: Timothy W. Potter

Keepers of Medieval and Later Antiquities
The Keeper of Medieval and Later Antiquities was head of the Department of Medieval and Later Antiquities. The department was created from the Department of British and Medieval Antiquities in 1969.

 1975–1998: Neil Stratford

Keepers of Coins and Medals
The Keeper of Coins and Medals is head of the Department of Coins and Medals.

 1861–1870: William Sandys Wright Vaux
1870–1893: Reginald Stuart Poole
 1893–1906: Barclay V. Head
 1906–1912: Herbert Appold Grueber
 1912–1931: George Francis Hill
 1931–1949: John Allan
 1949–1952: Stanley Robinson
 1952–1964: John Walker
 1965–1978: G. Kenneth Jenkins
 1978–1983: Robert Carson
 1983–1990: John Kent
 1990–1992: Mark Jones
 1992–2003: Andrew Burnett
 2003–2010: Joe Cribb
 2010–2020: Philip Attwood
 2020–2022: Jane Portal; Acting Keeper
 2022-present: Tom Hockenhull

Keepers of Conservation
The Keeper of Conservation and Scientific Research is head of the Department of Conservation and Scientific Research.

 1975–1979: Harold Barker; Keeper of Conservation and Technical Services
 1985–2002: Andrew Oddy; Keeper of Conservation
 2002–2005: Sheridan Bowman; Keeper of Conservation, Documentation and Science
 2005–2015: David Saunders; Keeper of Conservation and Scientific Research
 2015-present: Carl Heron

Keepers of Greece and Rome
The Keeper of Greece and Rome is head of the Department of Greece and Rome. It was formerly known as the Keeper of Greek and Roman Antiquities.

 1861–1885: Charles Thomas Newton
 1886–1904: Alexander Stuart Murray
 1904–1909: Cecil Harcourt Smith
 1909–1925: Arthur Smith
 1925–1932: Henry Beauchamp Walters
 1932–1936: John Forsdyke
 1936–1939: Frederick N. Pryce
 1939–1956: Bernard Ashmole
 1956–1976: D. E. L. Haynes
 1976–1993: Brian Cook
 1993–2007: Dyfri Williams
 2007–present: Lesley Fitton

Keepers of the Middle East
The Keeper of the Middle East is head of the Department of the Middle East (formerly Department of Western Asiatic Antiquities, then Department of Ancient Near East).

 1955–1974: Richard David Barnett
 1974–1983: Edmond Sollberger
 1985–1989: Terence Croft Mitchell
 1989–2011: John Curtis
 current: Jonathan N. Tubb

Keepers of Portable Antiquities and Treasure
Keeper of Portable Antiquities and Treasure is head of the Department of Portable Antiquities and Treasure, and head of the Portable Antiquities Scheme.

 2005–2013: Roger Bland

Keepers of Prints and Drawings
The Simon Sainsbury Keeper of Prints and Drawings is head of the Department of Prints and Drawings.

 1833–1836: William Young Ottley
1836–1845: Henry Josi
1845–1866: William Hookham Carpenter
1866–1883: George William Reid
 1883–1912: Sidney Colvin
 1912–1932: Campbell Dodgson
 1933–1945: Arthur Mayger Hind
 1945–1954: Arthur E. Popham
 1954–1973: Edward Croft-Murray
 1973–1981: John Gere
 1981–1991: John Rowlands
 1991–2011: Antony Griffiths
 2011–present: Hugo Chapman

References

British Museum
British Museum, keepers of the